Wrangel (sometimes transliterated as Wrangell or Vrangel, from the Russian Вра́нгель) is a Baltic German noble family, whose members have also been included in Swedish, Russian, Spanish and Prussian nobility. The family's earliest known patrilineal ancestor is the knight Eilardus (1241†).

Notable members 
 Herman Wrangel (ca.1584-1643), a Swedish Governor-General of Livonia, Field Marshal, and Privy Councillor
 Carl Henrik Wrangel (1681–1755), a Swedish Field Marshal
 Carl Gustaf Wrangel (1613–1676), a Swedish soldier and Privy Councillor (son of Herman Wrangel)
 Heinrich Johann Freiherr Wrangell from Addinal (Andrei Ivanovich Wrangel, 1736–1813), Russian General-Lieutenant
 Friedrich Heinrich Ernst Graf von Wrangel (1784-1877), a Generalfeldmarschall of the Prussian Army.
 Ferdinand von Wrangel (Ferdinand Petrovich Wrangel, 1797–1870), Imperial Russian Navy admiral, Arctic explorer, Governor of Russian Alaska
 Ferdinand Georg Friedrich von Wrangel (Ferdinand Ferdinandovich Wrangel, 1844–1919)
 Pyotr Nikolayevich Wrangel (Peter von Wrangel, 1878–1928), a leader of the White Army during the Russian Civil War
 Alexander von Wrangel (Alexander Evataiyevich Wrangel, 1804–1880), Baron, Russian infantry general
 Alexander Egorovich Wrangell (1833–1915), Baron, Russian diplomat
 Wilhelm Bernhard Friedrich von Wrangel (Vasily Vasiliyevich Wrangel, 1797–1872), Baron, Imperial Russian Navy admiral
 Vasily Georgiyevich Wrangel (1816–1860)
 Georg Gustav Ludwig von Wrangel (Yegor Vasiliyevich Wrangel, 1784–1841)
 Karl Michael von Wrangel (Karl Yegorovich Wrangel, 1794–1874), Baron Russian cavalry general
 Friedrich Wilhelm Karl Oskar von Wrangel (1812-1899), Prussian Infantry General
 Reinhold Otto Fabian von Wrangel (Roman Yegorovich Wrangel, 1797–1884), Russian General of Artillery
 Karl Karlovich Wrangel (1800–1872), Baron, Russian infantry general
 Hans Georg Hermann von Wrangel (Yegor Ermolayevich Wrangel, 1803–1868)
 Karl Gustav von Wrangel (Karl Reingoldovich Wrangel, 1742–1824), Russian infantry general.
 Georg von Wrangel (Yegor Yegorovich Wrangel, 1827–1875), Russian senator
 Baroness Helene Von Wrangel (or Vrangel) (1835-1906) Russian painter 
 Michael von Wrangel (Mihhail Yegorovich Wrangel, 1803–1868), Russian General-Lieutenant, Governor of Livland
 Vasily Georgiyevich Wrangel (1862–1901), composer
 Margarethe Mathilde von Wrangell (1877–1932), the first female full professor at a German university (University of Hohenheim, Stuttgart)
 Nikolaus von Wrangel (Nikolai Yegorovich Wrangel, 1847-1920), Baron, author of memoirs, "From Serfdom to Bolshevism"
 Herman Wrangel (1857–1934), Swedish Count, diplomat, Minister for Foreign Affairs
 Herman Wrangel (1859–1938), Swedish lieutenant general
 Herman Wrangel (1864–1945), Swedish major general
 Nikolai Nikolayevich Wrangel (1880–1915)
 Olaf von Wrangel (1928–2009), Baron, German parliamentarian

See also
 Friedrich Heinrich Ernst Graf von Wrangel (1784–1877), Prussian Generalfeldmarschall''

References

Further reading

 

 
Swedish noble families
German noble families
Russian noble families
Baltic nobility
Baltic-German people